Jack Cockbill (7 March 1880 – 6 April 1944) was an Australian rules footballer who played with South Melbourne in the Victorian Football League (VFL).

Notes

External links 

1880 births
1944 deaths
Australian rules footballers from Melbourne
Sydney Swans players
People educated at Melbourne Grammar School